Wilbur R. Ingalls Jr., (February 21, 1923 − September 23, 1997) was an American architect from the state of Maine. Ingalls focused mainly on schools, but also designed other types of public buildings such as churches and banks.

Early life
Wilbur R. Ingalls Jr. was the son of Laura Lewis Ingalls and Wilbur R. Ingalls Sr. He was born in Portland, Maine and attended Portland Public Schools, graduating from Deering High School in 1942. Ingalls was a member of the United States Army and served in Europe during World War II. During his time in the Army, Ingalls attended the Arizona State Teachers College at Tempe as an aviation cadet. After the war he returned to Portland and attended the Portland Junior College. In 1952 Ingalls graduated from the School of Architecture at Syracuse University.

Career
Shortly after graduating from Syracuse, Ingalls began his career as an architect at the firm of Alonzo J. Harriman, in Auburn, Maine. In 1956 he worked for Engineering Services of Portland, and in 1957 he opened his own private architecture firm, which he continued until retiring in 1995.

In a 1989 letter to The Portland Press Herald, Ingalls wrote, "It is a matter of architectural philosophy to use a few quality exterior materials in a simple way and let the interiors unfold as a series of surprises."

Ingalls designed more than 60 schools throughout Maine.  He also designed several churches and banks. According to Ingalls' wife, his favorite designs were the Howard C. Reiche Community School and the Portland Arts & Technology High School.

Works

Schools

Churches

Municipal buildings

Commercial buildings

References

External links
 

1923 births
1997 deaths
Architects from Portland, Maine
United States Army soldiers
United States Army personnel of World War II
Arizona State University alumni
Syracuse University alumni
University of Southern Maine alumni
20th-century American architects
Deering High School alumni
Military personnel from Portland, Maine